Edward Stirling may refer to:
 Edward Charles Stirling, Australian anthropologist and professor of physiology
 Edward Stirling (politician), his father, early settler of South Australia and member of the Legislative Council
 Edward Stirling (playwright), English stage manager, actor and dramatist
 Ed Stirling Scottish footballer

See also
 Edward Stirling Dickson, Royal Navy officer